The Virago 250 is an entry-level cruiser motorcycle built by Yamaha Motor Company. It has claimed a top speed of 85 mph.

V Star 250 (2008–present)
In the 2008 model overview, the Virago 250 has been replaced with the V Star 250, but the specs remain very similar to the Virago 250.
NOTE: Australia still offers the Virago 250 (XV250) as well as the V Star 250 (XVS250),

Specifications

Official

Unofficial (Practical)

References

External links
 V Star 250 on Yamaha Motor

XV250
Cruiser motorcycles
Motorcycles introduced in 1988